The 2003 Grand Prix SAR La Princesse Lalla Meryem was a women's tennis tournament played on outdoor clay courts in Casablanca, Morocco that was part of the Tier V category of the 2003 WTA Tour. It was the third edition of the tournament and was held from 31 March until 6 April 2003. Second-seeded Rita Grande won the singles title and earned $16,000 first-prize money.

Finals

Singles
 Rita Grande defeated  Antonella Serra Zanetti 6–2, 4–6, 6–1
 It was Grande's 1st singles title of her the year and the 3rd of her career.

Doubles
 Gisela Dulko /  María Emilia Salerni defeated  Henrieta Nagyová /  Elena Tatarkova 6–3, 6–4

External links
 ITF tournament edition details
 Tournament draws

Grand Prix Sar La Princesse Lalla Meryem
Morocco Open
2003 in Moroccan tennis